Merrick Systems, Inc. provides industrial information technologies for the midstream and upstream oil and gas industry. Merrick delivers integrated applications that include; real-time surveillance and optimization, field operations management, field data capture, hydrocarbon production accounting, mobile computing for field and drilling operations, and ruggedized RFID for drilling and asset management.

Merrick employs nearly 80 people and is headquartered in Houston, Texas.

Merrick’s worldwide presence today includes the Middle East, Asia Pacific, Northern Europe and the Americas.

History 
Merrick was co-founded by Samina Farid and Kemal Farid, an aunt-nephew team in 1989.

Merrick launched its first product to the market in 1992. Today, Merrick’s software is used in 20% of all oil and gas wells in the US and around the globe.

In 2011, Merrick received a majority investment from HitecVision, a leading oil and gas focused private equity firm. The founders of Merrick, Samina Farid, Chairman, and Kemal Farid, CEO, remain significant shareholders in the company.

References 

Companies based in Houston
Defunct software companies of the United States